Quantum Break is an action-adventure third-person shooter video game developed by Remedy Entertainment and published by Microsoft Studios, released for Microsoft Windows and Xbox One. The game features digital episodes that interact with the game based on the player's choices which, not unlike previous Remedy Entertainment entry Alan Wake with its Bright Falls mini-series, tie into the main plot and expand the game's universe.

The four episodes run concurrently with the game, interleaved between the game's five acts. The episodes are impacted in varying degrees by antagonist Paul Serene's actions, and to a lesser extent by protagonist Jack Joyce's involvement in the environment (such as stealing a company gala invite making an employee late). The episodes are not vital to understanding the plot, but simply supplement the story by providing perspectives other than that of Jack Joyce.

Episodes

Season 1 

Lists of episodes
Transmedia storytelling